The 2019 Betfred World Club Challenge was the 27th staging of the World Club Challenge. It was played on 17 February 2019, and featured Super League champions Wigan Warriors, and NRL winners Sydney Roosters.

This was the second time these two teams had met in the World Club Challenge, with Sydney claiming a 36–14 victory in 2014. Wigan were aiming to extend their record winning total to five wins, whilst Sydney were aiming to equal Wigan's record with their fourth win, as well as keeping their 100% record in the World Club Challenge intact.

Sydney won the match 20–8, thus equalling Wigan's record of 4 wins, and maintaining their 100% record of never losing a world club challenge.

Background

Wigan Warriors

After becoming the first team to win every game in the Super 8s, Wigan finished Super League XXIII's regular season in 2nd place.  They went on to beat Castleford Tigers 14–0 in the semi-final, and defeated 4th-placed Warrington Wolves, 12–4, in the Grand Final.

Sydney Roosters

The Roosters finished the 2018 NRL season in 1st place and won the minor premiership. They then went undefeated through the finals series to claim the 2018 Premiership with a 21–6 win in the 2018 NRL Grand Final over the Melbourne Storm.

Teams

Match Details

References

2019 in Australian rugby league
2019 in English rugby league
World Club Challenge
Sydney Roosters matches
Wigan Warriors matches
World Club Challenge